Marino Badoer, O.S.B. (died 1648) was a Roman Catholic prelate who served as Bishop of Pula (1641–1648).

Biography
On 8 January 1634, Marino Badoer was ordained a priest in the Order of Saint Benedict. On 1 July 1641, he was appointed by Pope Urban VIII as Bishop of Pula. On 7 July 1641, he was consecrated bishop by Giulio Cesare Sacchetti, Cardinal-Priest of Santa Susanna with Emilio Bonaventura Altieri, Bishop of Camerino, and Bernardo Florio, Bishop of Canea, serving as co-consecrators. He served as Bishop of Pula until his death in 1648.

References

External links and additional sources
 (for Chronology of Bishops) 
 (for Chronology of Bishops) 

17th-century Roman Catholic bishops in Croatia
1648 deaths
Bishops appointed by Pope Urban VIII
Benedictine bishops
Marino